Longuet is a surname of French origin. It may refer to :
 Benjamin Longuet (1685–1761), English banker and Governor of the Bank of England 1747–49
 Charles Longuet (1839–1903), French journalist and socialist
 Charles Stephen Longuet (1861–1941), New Zealand lawyer and Mayor of Invercargill 
 Didi Longuet (born 1981), Dutch professional footballer
 Edgar Longuet (1879–1950), French physician and socialist, grandson of Karl Marx
 Gérard Longuet (born 1946), French conservative politician
 Jean Longuet (1876–1938), French socialist, son of Jenny and Charles Longuet, grandson of Karl Marx
 Jenny Longuet (1844–1883), daughter of Jenny and Karl Marx, and wife of Charles Longuet
 Karl-Jean Longuet (1904–1981),  French sculptor, son of Jean Longuet
 Robert-Jean Longuet (1901–1987), French lawyer and journalist

See also
 H. Christopher Longuet-Higgins (1923–2004), English theoretical chemist and a cognitive scientist.
 Michael S. Longuet-Higgins (1925–2016), English mathematician and oceanographer at Institute for Nonlinear Science, brother of H. Christopher Longuet-Higgins